William Almond, known as Willie Almond (born 5 April 1868; died 1942) was an English footballer who played in The Football League for Accrington, Blackburn Rovers and Northwich Victoria.

In 1887 Willie Almond signed for Witton, the year Witton FC recruited 19 Professional Footballers (See Wikipedia article on Witton F.C.) Witton had its best run on both the FA Cup and the Lancashire Cup. What role Almond played in these Cup runs is not recorded.

Season 1888-1889
Blackburn Rovers had a highly successful inaugural league season in 1888–1889. They finished 4th in the League and reached the Semi-Final of the FA Cup. 
Willie Almond made his League and Club debut, playing at centre-half, on 15 September 1888 at Leamington Road, home of Blackburn Rovers in a match against Accrington. The match was drawn 5-5. When he made his League debut Willie Almond was 20 years and 163 days old; that made him, on the second weekend of League football, Blackburn Rovers' youngest player. Willie Almond scored his debut League goal on 10 November 1888 at Leamington Road, Blackburn against Everton FC. Blackburn Rovers won the match 3–0. Willie Almond missed only one of the 21 League matches played by Blackburn Rovers in season 1888-1889 and scored one League goal. As a centre-half he played in a defence-line that kept three clean sheets and kept the opposition to one-in-a-match on three separate occasions. In season 1888-89 Almond played one match as a wing-half and played in a midfield that achieved a big three-goal win.

References

1868 births
English footballers
Blackburn Rovers F.C. players
Accrington F.C. players
Northwich Victoria F.C. players
English Football League players
Year of death missing
Association football midfielders
Witton F.C. players
Middlesbrough F.C. players
Nelson F.C. players
Millwall F.C. players
Tottenham Hotspur F.C. players
Clapton F.C. players